Governor Hall may refer to:

David Hall (Delaware governor) (1752–1817), 15th Governor of Delaware
David Hall (Oklahoma governor) (1930–2016), 20th Governor of Oklahoma
Sir Douglas Hall, 14th Baronet (1909–2004), Governor of British Somaliland from 1959 to 1960
Fred Hall (1916–1970), 33rd Governor of Kansas
Hiland Hall (1795–1885), 25th Governor of Vermont
John Hathorn Hall (1894–1979), Governor of Aden from 1940 to 1945 and Governor of Uganda from 1945 to 1952
John Hubert Hall (1899–1970), 24th Governor of Oregon
John W. Hall (1817–1892), 44th Governor of Delaware
Joshua Hall (1768–1862), 8th Governor of Maine
Kenneth O. Hall (born 1941), 5th Governor-General of Jamaica
Luther E. Hall (1869–1921), 35th Governor of Louisiana
Lyman Hall (1724–1790), 13th Governor of Georgia
Willard Preble Hall (1820–1882), 17th Governor of Missouri
William Hall (governor) (1775–1856), 7th Governor of Tennessee